= Durral B. Evans =

American football coach

Coaching career (HC unless noted)
- 1921–1923: Kentucky State

Head coaching record
- Overall: 5–7

Durral B. Evans was the first head football coach at Kentucky State University in Frankfort, Kentucky and he held that position for three seasons, from 1921 until 1923. His career coaching record at Kentucky State was 5–7.
